The Empire Strikes First is the thirteenth studio album by American punk rock band Bad Religion, released on June 8, 2004. The album is heavily influenced by the then-current Iraq War (most notably in the songs "Atheist Peace", "Let Them Eat War" and the title track) and also has some nods to George Orwell's novel Nineteen Eighty-Four (the song title "Boot Stamping on a Human Face Forever" as well as the line "you deserve Two Minute Hate" in the title track are direct references to the book), the latter most likely inspired by the Patriot Act.

The album also marks the rare instance that non-members of Bad Religion received a writing credit, as Chris Wollard of Hot Water Music co-wrote two songs.

The song "Social Suicide" appears in the video games Tony Hawk's Project 8 and MX vs. ATV Untamed.

Release
On February 4, 2004, The Empire Strikes First was announced for release in a few months' time. On March 17, 2004, the album's artwork and the track listing were posted online. "Sinister Rouge" was made available for download through the label's website on April 11, 2004. "Los Angeles Is Burning" was released to radio on April 27, 2004. They toured Europe in May 2004, where they debuted several new songs from the album. The Empire Strikes First was released on June 8, 2004. The following day, the music video for "Los Angeles Is Burning" was posted on the label's website. Soon afterwards, they appeared at the KROQ Weenie Roast. In October and November 2004, the band went on a tour of the US with Rise Against and From First to Last. After playing a series of multi-day stints in venues in the US in June 2005, Bad Religion toured across Europe in August and September 2005, which included an appearance at the Reading and Leeds Festivals. In October and November 2005, they went on a North American trek with Anti-Flag and Pennywise.

Reception

It peaked at number 40 on the Billboard 200 album chart, the highest position the band had attained at the time. The album scored a minor radio hit with, "Los Angeles Is Burning", which also reached No. 40 on the Billboard Modern Rock Tracks chart. Alternative Press ranked "Los Angeles Is Burning" at number 90 on their list of the best 100 singles from the 2000s.

Track listing

Personnel

Bad Religion
 Greg Graffin – lead vocals, producer
 Greg Hetson – guitar
 Brian Baker – guitar, backup vocals
 Brett Gurewitz – guitar, backup vocals, producer
 Jay Bentley – bass guitar, backup vocals
 Brooks Wackerman – drums, percussion

Additional personnel

Musicians
 David Bragger – violin on "Atheist Peace"
 Mike Campbell – guitar on "Los Angeles is Burning"
 Sage Francis – guest vocals on "Let Them Eat War"
 John Ginty – Hammond B-3 on "Los Angeles is Burning"
 Leopold Ross – Sonic Alienator on "Beyond Electric Dreams"
 Claude Sarne – goth choir soprano on "Sinister Rouge"

Other
 Atticus Ross – programming
 Joe Barresi – engineer, mixing
 Tom Baker – mastering
 Pete Martinez – assistant engineer
 June Murakawa – assistant engineer
 Nick Pritchard – design
 Sean Murphy – photography
 Matt Rubin – photography
 Hans Buscher - Guitar Tech

Release history

Charts

References

External links

The Empire Strikes First at YouTube (streamed copy where licensed)

Bad Religion albums
2004 albums
Epitaph Records albums
Albums recorded at Sound City Studios
Works about George W. Bush
Works about the Iraq War